Stick It Out may refer to:
 Stick It Out (Rush song)
 Stick It Out (Right Said Fred song)
 Stick It Out (Frank Zappa song)